Jens Riewa (born 2 July 1963) is a German television presenter and broadcast news analyst for the Tagesschau, a programme produced by the German broadcaster ARD.

Childhood and youth 
Jens Riewa grew up in Lübben. He did his Abitur in Lübben in 1982. After this he spent a prolonged three years' military service with the National People's Army.

Professional training 
After having given up his studies for building industry technology at the Verkehrshochschule in Dresden, he underwent training as an air traffic controller. Then he was trained in speaking as well as presenting for radio at the Berliner Rundfunk for two years.

Career 
1988 he passed an application test for a position as a broadcast news analyst for the DFF.  After that he worked for the youth radio DT 64. After speaking for radio dramas, features, documentaries  and commercials between 1988 and 1991, the former chief presenter Werner Veigel took him to the Tagesschau in 1991 – initially Riewa was heard there as a voice actor, followed by a position as a broadcast news analyst from 1994 onwards. Since 6 September 1995, he has been the presenter of the main edition of the Tagesschau at 8 pm.

In 1994 Dieter Thomas Heck discovered him as a television presenter for the Deutsche Schlagerparade, after Birgit Schrowange had given up  presenting the broadcast after only one year. Riewa also presented the German qualifications for the Eurovision Song Contest in 1996 and 1997.

In 2021, he competed in The Masked Singer Germany's fifth season as The Chili and took home 10th place.

Private life 
In 1998, after recurring rumours, Riewa stated that he was not gay. He succeeded in suing two publishers for 15.000 DM compensation after they had proclaimed him as homosexual.
He faked an affair with German singer Michelle in 2002. His confessions about sexual intercourse with her annoyed his employer ARD, which he then apologised for, so it did not lead to any consequences.

External links

References 

1963 births
Living people
People from Lübbenau
People from Bezirk Cottbus
Air traffic controllers
German television presenters
German broadcast news analysts
ARD (broadcaster) people
Tagesschau (ARD) presenters and reporters